Haystack Island is an island located in Investigator Strait off the south coast of Yorke Peninsula in the Australian state of South Australia about  south-west of Stenhouse Bay.  Since 1972, it has been part of the Althorpe Islands Conservation Park.

Description 

It is described as ‘a narrow wall of sheer cliffs, undermined, indented and marked by fresh scars and rockfalls’ and that ‘has been eroded to a series of tall lobes connected by thin necks of rock that narrow to an almost knife-edge ridge’. It is surrounded by a ‘fringing wave-cut reef’. Its long axis is aligned in a north-west to south-east direction.

Access is reported as best done in calm seas and that the summit ridge can be reached from the island’s east coast via a rubble cone of rubble, taking care when climbing the slope’s ‘loose and crumbling’ surface.  A survey carried out in 1982 by the responsible government agency used a helicopter to access the island’s summit.
A number of sources consider Haystack Island along with the Althorpe Islands and Seal Island to be a group of islands known as the Althorpe Islands Group.

Formation, geology and oceanography 

Haystack Island was formed about 7350 years ago after sea levels rose at the start of the Holocene thereby separating Yorke Peninsula from Kangaroo Island.
Haystack Island consists of a seam of Bridgewater Formation calcarenite that sits on a largely submerged ridge of Gleesons Landing Granite.
Haystack Island rises from a depth of  within  from its southern shore.

Flora and fauna

Flora 

A survey carried out in November 1982 found 11 species of plants making up a shrubland covering the island’s ridge including Grey Samphire, Marsh saltbush, and Nitre-bush in the deeper soils, and Cushion-bush, Round-leaved Pigface and Southern Sea-heath in the shallower soils.

Fauna 

A survey carried out in November 1982 reported evidence of the presence of the following vertebrate animals - the White-faced storm petrel by the presence of ‘shallow burrows’ used during the ‘summer breeding season’, Pacific gull by the existence of a ‘large midden of shell fragments was found on the highest dome, indicating a feeding site…’, and the White-bellied sea eagle by the presence of a ‘maintained nest’.

Protected areas status 

Since 1972, Haystack Island has been part of the Althorpe Islands Conservation Park.  Since 2007, it has been a prohibited area where access is only allowed by permit in order to protect the breeding population of seabirds.  Since 2012, the waters surrounding its shores are part of a habitat protection zone located within the boundaries of the Southern Spencer Gulf Marine Park.

References 

Islands of South Australia
Uninhabited islands of Australia
Yorke Peninsula
Investigator Strait